The longfin mojarra (Pentaprion longimanus) is a species of mojarra native to the coastal waters of the Indian Ocean from India to the western Pacific. This species is of minor importance to local commercial fisheries, usually being made into fish meal or feed for ducks. It is the only known member of the genus Pentaprion.

References

External links
 Photograph

Gerreidae
Fish described in 1849